New Lexicon is the  third full-length album from Philadelphia's Paint It Black. It was released on Jade Tree Records on February 19, 2008. Over a month before the album's release date, on January 6, the band gave away copies of the Goliath 7" single to everyone that came out to their record release show at the First Unitarian Church of Philadelphia.

Track listing 
 "The Ledge" - 1:31
 "Four Deadly Venoms" - 1:37
 "We Will Not" - 2:48
 "Past Tense, Future Perfect" - 2:20
 "Missionary Position" - 1:40
 "White Kids Dying of Hunger" - 2:07
 "Gravity Wins" - 2:49
 "Dead Precedents" - 0:46
 "The Beekeeper" - 1:53
 "Check Yr Math" - 1:28
 "So Much for Honour Among Thieves" - 1:50
 "New Folk Song" - 2:15
 "Saccharine" - 1:26
 "Severance" - 3:22
 "Shell Game Redux" - 2:37

Personnel 
 Dan Yemin – vocals, guitar
 Josh Agran – guitar
 Andy Nelson – bass guitar, vocals
 Jared Shavelson – drums

References 

Paint It Black (band) albums
2008 albums
Jade Tree (record label) albums